Planet X is the eighth album by Helios Creed, released on October 7, 1994, through Amphetamine Reptile Records.

Track listing

Personnel 
Musicians
Helios Creed – guitar, synthesizer, sampler, mixing, production
Chris McKay – bass guitar
Paul Della Pelle – drums
Z Sylver – synthesizer, sampler
Production and additional personnel
John Boyko – engineering

References

External links 
 

1994 albums
Amphetamine Reptile Records albums
Helios Creed albums